A capability is an ability that an organization, person, or system possesses. Capabilities are typically expressed in general and high-level terms and typically require a combination of organization, people, processes, and technology to achieve. For example, marketing, customer contact, and outbound telemarketing are examples of capabilities.

References

External links 
TOGAF 9.1 Online

Strategic management